Miiko Martín Albornoz Inola (born 30 November 1990) is a Chilean professional footballer who plays as a left-back for Danish 1st Division club Vejle Boldklub.

Born in Sweden, Albornoz started his professional career with IF Brommapojkarna before joining Malmö FF with whom he won the 2013 and 2014 Allsvenskan titles. He then moved on to play in Germany for Hannover 96. A youth player for Sweden, he opted to play his senior international football for Chile and was a part of Chile's 2014 World Cup and 2015 Copa América squads.

Club career

Brommapojkarna
Albornoz began his career at four years of age at IF Brommapojkarna where he played his way through various youth teams before he joined the first team in 2007. He played his first match in 2008 in Superettan, the second tier of the Swedish football league system. He played his first Allsvenskan match in 2009.

Malmö FF
Albornoz signed a four-year contract with Swedish champions Malmö FF on 14 August 2011. At Malmö FF he took over shirt number 14 from Guillermo Molins who had left the club in the same transfer window. He was presented as the club's new player in front of a crowd of 23,180 at Swedbank Stadion before an exhibition game against A.C. Milan. Albornoz made his debut for the club in a 2–1 win over GAIS in Allsvenskan on 20 August 2011. In total Albornoz played six league matches in Malmö FF for his first season at the club and also got to play for the club in the 2011–12 UEFA Europa League group stage.

For the 2012 season, Albornoz played much of the pre-season as right-back, even though he is left-footed and had never before played to the right. Against Syrianska FC on 23 April, he started as right-back and played 90 minutes. Albornoz continued to play at the position for the following games, replacing Ulrich Vinzents who had been the starting player at the position since 2006. Albornoz played one of his best games for Malmö FF at home against AIK on 2 July when he was awarded the man of the match award. On 27 August Albornoz scored his first goal for the club, a hard volley shot from outside the penalty area, for Malmö FF in a home fixture against GIF Sundsvall. Albornoz played 27 matches and scored three goals in total for Malmö FF in 2012.

Albornoz changed from the number 14 jersey to number 3 ahead of the 2013 season. On 22 April 2013, he made his first appearance for the season after his suspension in a home fixture against Östers IF. He went on to play in all of the club's remaining league matches and scoring one goal in the title winning season where he played a major role. Albornoz also played all of Malmö FF's matches in the qualification stage for the 2013–14 UEFA Europa League. He was nominated as defender of the year for the 2013 Allsvenskan for his overall performance during the season.

During the 2014 season Albornoz played nine out of twelve possible matches before the 2014 FIFA World Cup and his transfer to Hannover. He also played all of the matches for the club in the 2013–14 Svenska Cupen campaign where the club progressed to the semi-finals. Malmö eventually went on to win a second straight Allsvenskan title only a few months following Albornoz' departure.

Hannover 96
On 20 June 2014, the transfer of Albornoz to the German Bundesliga club Hannover was officially announced. The transfer was completed on 1 July 2014 when the German transfer window opened. Albornoz was in Brazil with the Chile national team for the 2014 FIFA World Cup at the time of the transfer.

Colo-Colo
In March 2021, free agent Albornoz joined Chilean Primera División club Colo-Colo. The club later decided not to renew his contract in December of the same year.

International career

Sweden
Between 2005 and 2013, Albornoz was a regular youth international for Sweden. He played in all youth categories, from under-17s to under-21s. In December 2013, Erik Hamren called Albornoz to be part of the senior squad, to play friendlies in the Middle East. Albornoz rejected the call-up choosing instead to wait to be nominated to play for Chile.

Chile
In December 2013, Albornoz stated to Chilean media that he was able to play for Chile in a friendly against Germany on 5 March. But Jorge Sampaoli called Albornoz for a friendly against Costa Rica, on 22 January. He rejected Sweden in favour of Chile to have a chance to play in the 2014 FIFA World Cup. Albornoz earned his first international cap against Costa Rica, on 22 January, scoring the opening goal in a 4–0 victory. On 13 May 2014, Albornoz was called for the provisional 30-man squad for the World Cup. Albornoz earned his second cap against Egypt, and on the following day, he was confirmed on the 23-man squad that played in Brazil. Although Chile reached the round of 16, Albornoz didn't play in any match.

Personal life
His father is Chilean and his mother is of Finnish descent. His older brother Mauricio is also a professional footballer.

Statutory rape 
On 8 January 2013, it was made official that Albornoz was being charged with statutory rape for having had sexual relations with a 14-year-old girl on 8 November 2012 in Malmö. Albornoz was detained and arrested for the offence on 17 November 2012, but was released after three days. Albornoz admitted that he was aware of the girl's age at the time of the act. Media reported that the relationship was mutually consensual and that no violence or force had occurred during the act. Malmö FF published a press release the same day stating that Albornoz would take a time-out from all activities with the club until further notice.

Albornoz was found guilty and was given a suspended sentence in the trial held on 12 February 2013. As a result of the conviction Malmö FF announced a two months' extension of the time-out, but that Albornoz would be allowed to train with the squad during this period. They also announced that a new decision regarding the player's situation would be taken at the end of this period. On 10 April 2013, Malmö FF held a press conference and announced that Albornoz's time-out was now over and that he would be available for squad selection once again for the Allsvenskan match against Östers IF on 22 April 2013. Albornoz was unavailable for play in the group stage of the 2012–13 Svenska Cupen which was held in March 2013 as well as the four opening fixtures of the 2013 Allsvenskan season.

Career statistics

Club

International

Scores and results list Chile's goal tally first, score column indicates score after each Albornoz goal.

Honours
Malmö
 Allsvenskan: 2013, 2014
 Svenska Supercupen: 2013

Colo-Colo
 Copa Chile: 2021

Chile
 Copa América: 2015

References

External links

  
 
 
 
 

1990 births
Living people
Footballers from Stockholm
Swedish people of Chilean descent
Swedish people of Finnish descent
Sportspeople of Chilean descent
Swedish footballers
Sweden youth international footballers
Sweden under-21 international footballers
Citizens of Chile through descent
Chilean people of Finnish descent
Chilean footballers
Chile international footballers
2014 FIFA World Cup players
2015 Copa América players
Copa América-winning players
Association football fullbacks
Association football midfielders
IF Brommapojkarna players
Malmö FF players
Hannover 96 players
Colo-Colo footballers
Vejle Boldklub players
Allsvenskan players
Superettan players
Bundesliga players
Danish Superliga players
Chilean expatriate footballers
Chilean expatriate sportspeople in Germany
Expatriate footballers in Germany
Chilean expatriate sportspeople in Denmark
Expatriate men's footballers in Denmark
Naturalized citizens of Chile